Patiala is a city in southeastern Punjab, northwestern India. It is the fourth largest city in the state and is the administrative capital of Patiala district. Patiala is located around the Qila Mubarak (the 'Fortunate Castle') constructed by the Sidhu Jat Sikh chieftain Ala Singh, who founded the royal dynasty of Patiala State in 1763, and after whom the city is named.

In popular culture, the city remains famous for its traditional Patiala shahi turban (a type of headgear), paranda (a tasselled tag for braiding hair), Patiala salwar (a type of female trousers), jutti (a type of footwear) and Patiala peg (a measure of liquor). Patiala is also known as Patiala - The Royal City and Patiala - The Beautiful City.

Etymology 
'Patiala' comes from the roots pati and ala, the former is local word for a "strip of land" and 'ala' comes from the name of the founder of the city, Ala Singh. So, 'Patiala' can be translated into English to mean ‘the land of Ala’.

History

Patiala state was established in 1763 by Ala Singh, a Jat Sikh chieftain, who laid the foundation of the Patiala fort known as Qila Mubarak, around 'which the present city of Patiala is built. After the Third Battle of Panipat in 1761 in which the Marathas were defeated by the Afghans, the writ of the Afghans prevailed throughout Punjab. It is at this stage that the rulers of Patiala began to acquire ensigns of royalty. The Patiala state saw more than forty years of a ceaseless power struggle with the Afghan Durrani Empire, Maratha Empire and the Sikh Empire of Lahore.

In 1808, the Raja of Patiala entered into a treaty with the British against Sikh ruler Maharaja Ranjit Singh of Lahore in 1808, thus becoming collaborator in the grand empire building process by the British in, the sub-continent of India. Patiala became a 17-guns salute state during the British Raj. The rulers of Patiala such as Karam Singh, Narinder Singh, Mahendra Singh, Rajinder Singh, Bhupinder Singh, and Yadvindra Singh were treated with respect and dignity by the British.

The city of Patiala was designed and developed according to a plan akin to that of temple architecture, the first settlers of Patiala were the Hindus of Sirhind, who opened their business establishments outside the Darshani Gate.

Tourist attractions

Kali Devi Mandir

Kali Devi Temple is a Hindu temple dedicated to Maa Kaali. The temple was built by the Sikh ruler of the Patiala State, Maharaja Bhupinder Singh, who financed the building of the temple in his capital and oversaw its installation in 1936. Legend has it that the Maharaja built the temple to protect the city from flooding and performed annual sacrifice at the temple. Bhupinder Singh ruled the princely state of Patiala from 1900 to 1938. He brought the 6-ft statue of Divine Mother Kali and Paawan Jyoti from Bengal to Patiala and offered the first Bali (sacrifice) of a water buffalo to the temple. Because of the temple's beautiful structure, it has been declared a national monument. This large complex attracts devotees, Hindu and Sikh, from distant places.

A much older temple of Raj Rajeshwari is also situated in the center of this complex. The temple is situated opposite the Baradari garden at Mall Road. Devotees offer mustard oil, daal (lentils), sweets, coconuts, bangles, and chunnis, goats, hens, and liquor to the Divine Mother here. As an average estimate, devotees offer more than 60,000 liquor bottles during Navratras alone, which distributed to the beggars sitting outside the temple, and goes into a 'Sharab Kund' built on the temple's premises.

Gurdwara Dukh Niwaran Sahib 

According to local tradition, supported by an old handwritten document preserved in the Gurdwara, one Bhag Ram, a Jhivar of Lehal, waited upon ninth Guru of Sikhs Guru Tegh Bahadur during his sojourn at Saifabad (now Bahadurgarh). He requested that the Guru might be pleased to visit and bless his village so that its inhabitants could be rid of a severe and mysterious sickness that had been their bane for a long time.

The Guru visited Lehal on Magh sudi 5, 1728 Bikram/24 January 1672 and stayed under a banyan tree by the side of a pond. The sickness in the village subsided. The site where Guru Tegh Bahadur had sat came to be known as Dukh Nivaran, literally meaning eradicator of suffering. Devotees have faith in the healing qualities of water in the Sarovar attached to the shrine. It is still believed that any illness can be cured by 'ishnaan' on five consecutive Panchami. It is in the vicinity of Patiala Bus Station.

Gurdwara Moti Bagh 
Gurudwara Moti Baag is situated in the outerskirts of Patiala City. When Shri Guru Teg Bahadur started his journey towards Delhi, he came here via Kiratpur Sahib, Bharatgarh Sahib, Roap Makar, Kabulpur, etc. Saint Saif Ali Khan was a great follower of Guru, To fulfill his wish Guru Sahib came to his Place Saifabad (Bahadur Garh). The holly Guru stayed here for 3 Months. Saif Ali Khan Served the Guru with great devotion. In the daytime Guru Teg Bahadur used to meditate on the Place inside the Qila (Fort) and at night time, he would come here. From here the Guru left for Samana and stayed in the Haveli of Muhamad Bakhshish. From there onward, Guru Sahib left towards Cheeka Via Karhali, Balbera.

Bahadurgarh Fort 
The Bahadurgarh Fort is 6 kilometers away from Patiala city. It is situated on Patiala-Chandigarh road. The fort was constructed by mughal Nawab Saif Khan in 1658 A.D where Guru Teg Bahadur visited him and later renovated by a Sikh ruler Maharaja Karam Singh in 1837. The construction of the entire fort was completed in eight years. A sum of ten lakh rupees was spent on its construction. The fort is enclosed within two rounded walls and a moat. The circumference of the fort is slightly over two kilometers.

The name Bahadurgarh fort was given by Maharaja Karam Singh as a tribute to the Sikh Guru Teg Bahadur who stayed here for three months and nine days before leaving for Delhi where he was executed by Aurangzeb in 1675 CE. The fort consists of a historical Gurdwara Sahib (a Sikh temple) named Gurdwara Sahib Patshai Nauvin. This Gurudwara shows the fine Sikh architecture. This Gurudwara is controlled by the Shiromani Gurdwara Prabhandak Committee. People visit this Gurudwara on the occasion of the festival of Baisakhi on 13 April, every year.

Qila Mubarak complex 

The Qila Mubarak complex stands on a 10-acre ground in the heart of the city and contains the main palace or Qila Androon (literally, 'inner fort'), the guesthouse or Ran Baas and the Darbar Hall. Outside the Qila are the Darshani Gate, a Shiva temple, and bazaar shops which border the streets that run around the Qila and sell precious ornaments, colorful hand-woven fabrics, 'jootis' and bright 'Paradis'.

It was the principal residence of the Patiala royals until the construction of Old Moti Bagh Palace.

The entrance is through an imposing gate. The architectural style of the palace is a synthesis of late Mughal and Rajasthani. The complex has ten courtyards along the north-south axis. Each courtyard is unique in size and character, some being broad, others very small and others mere slits in the fabric of the building. Though the Androon is a single interconnected building, it is spoken of as a series of palaces. Each set of rooms makes a cluster around a courtyard, and each carries a name: Topkhana, Qila Mubarak, Sheesh Mahal, Treasury, and Prison. Ten of the rooms are painted with frescoes or decorated intricately with mirror and gilt.

In a tiny portion of the complex is a little British construction with Gothic arches, fireplaces made of marble, and built-in toilets perched on the Mughal Rajasthani roof. Burj Baba Ala Singh has had a fire smouldering ever since the time of Ala Singh, along with a flame brought by him from Jwalaji. Every year it's decorated beautifully for the Heritage Festival.

Sheesh Mahal 

A part of the Old Moti Bagh Palace built in the 19th century by the Maharajas is the famous Sheesh Mahal, literally meaning the Palace of Mirrors. The mahal contains a large number of frescoes, most of which were made under His Highness Maharaja Narinder Singh. A lake in front of the palace adds to the beauty. Lakshman Jhula, a bridge built across the lake, is a famous attraction. A museum housing the largest collection of medals from the world collected by His Highness Maharaja Bhupinder Singh is here.

Currently, the museum along with the main building is closed for public viewing because of renovation. However, tourists can access the surroundings of the Mahal along with the Lakshman Jhula.

Baradari Gardens 

The Baradari Gardens, the garden with 12 gates, are in the north of old Patiala city, just outside Sheranwala Gate. The garden complex, set up during the reign of Maharaja Rajindera Singh, has extensive vegetation of rare trees, shrubs, and flowers dotted with impressive Colonial buildings and a marble statue of Maharaja Rajindera Singh. It was built as a royal residence with a cricket stadium, a skating rink, and a small palace set in its heart named Rajindera Kothi. The gardens include a museum building with collections of Maharaja Ranjeet Singh.

After extensive restoration, it opened as a heritage hotel run by Neemrana Hotels group in 2009. It is Punjab's first heritage hotel. It is near Press Club Patiala which was established in 2006 and now headed by Parveen Komal, president.

Press Club Patiala is situated at Barandari Garden Near 20 No. Railway Crossing. Headed by Mr. Parveen Komal President www.pressclubpatiala.com. It was established by Captain Amrinder Singh Chief Minister Of Punjab in 2006.

12 Royal Gates of Patiala 

 Darshani Gate - Main entrance of Quilla Mubarak 
 Sanouri Gate
 Lahori Gate
 Sherawala Gate
 Sunami Gate
 Sirhindi Gate
 Ghalori Gate
 Safabadi Gate
 Top Khana Gate
 Nabha Gate
 Samania Gate
 Rajindera Gate

National Institute of Sports 
Founded in 1961, Netaji Subhas National Institute of Sports (NIS) is Asia's largest sports institute in princely city of Patiala. The institute was renamed Netaji Subhas National Institute of Sports in January 1973.NIS is housed in the Old Moti Bagh palace of the erstwhile royal family of Patiala, which was purchased by the government of India after Indian Independence. Today, several sports memorabilia, like a has (doughnut-shaped exercise disc), weighing 95  kg, used by the Great Gama for squats, Major Dhyan Chand's gold medal, from 1928 Amsterdam Olympics, and PT Usha 1986 Seoul Asiad shoes, are housed at the National Institute of Sports Museum.

Education

Since Indian independence in 1947, Patiala has emerged as a major education centre in the state of Punjab. The city houses the Thapar University, LM Thapar School of Management, Jagat Guru Nanak Dev Punjab State Open University, Punjab Sports University. Punjabi University, Rajiv Gandhi National University of Law, General Shivdev Singh Diwan Gurbachan Singh Khalsa College, Mohindra College, Aryans College of Law, Multani Mal Modi College, Rajindra Hospital, Government Medical College, Patiala, Prof. Gursewak Singh Government College of Physical Education, Government College for Girls, and Govt. Bikram College of Commerce, one of the premier commerce colleges in northern India.

Netaji Subhash National Institute of Sports, Patiala is a sports hub of north India. Rajiv Gandhi National University of Law, Patiala was the first national law school of the north region established under the Punjab Government Act of 2006.

List of Universities in Patiala: 

List of Schools in Patiala:
 Guru Nanak Foundation Public School, Patiala
 Our Lady of Fatima Convent Sec. School, Patiala
 St. Peter's Academy
 The British Co-Ed High School
 Budha Dal Public School

Sporting venues and gardens
Patiala is home to numerous inter-state sporting teams in tournaments like Black Elephants. The city has facilities for cricket, swimming, shooting, skating and hockey. The city has stadiums such as Dhruv Pandove Ground, Raja Bhalinder Stadium, Yadavindra Sports Stadium (YPS) and National Institute of Sports.

The latest addition to sports is the state-of-the-art shotgun shooting ranges housing New Moti Bagh Gun Club at village Maine. Founded by the royal family of Patiala, these ranges are home to the Indian Shotgun Shooting team who routinely trains here. It has recently hosted the 2nd Asian Shotgun Championship.

Patiala Central State Library

Patiala Central State Library is one of the oldest libraries of the state. It was opened in 1956 .It is named after the former Punjab Chief Minister  Giani Gurmukh Singh Musafir.The library has rare collection of books.There are more than 1,35,000 books in the library . Out of it  more than 15,000 books are  archival books and  3,000 rare manuscripts.

Governance
Patiala Municipal Corporation (PMC) is the local body responsible for governing, developing and managing the city. PMC is further divided into 60 municipal wards.

Patiala Development Authority (PDA) is an agency responsible for the planning and development of the greater Patiala Metropolitan Area, which is revising the Patiala Master Plan and Building Bylaws. Patiala Development Department, a special department of the Government of Punjab, has been recently formed for overall development.

Patiala consists of three assembly constituencies: Patiala Urban, Patiala Rural, Sanaur.

Geography
It has an average elevation of 250 metres (820 feet). During the short existence of PEPSU, Patiala served as its capital city.

Climate

Demographics
According to the 2021 census, Patiala UA had a population of 820,000 and Patiala city 763,280. Males constituted 54% of the population, and females 46%. Patiala had an average literacy rate of 86%, higher than the national average of 64.9%. In Patiala, 10% of the population was under 5 years of age.

Culture and traditions

Patiala's sway over the Malwa area extended beyond merely political influence. Patiala was equally the set of religious and cultural life. Educationally, Patiala was at the forefront. Patiala was the first town in this part of the country to have a degree college – the Mohindra College – in 1870.

Patiala has seen the evolution of a distinct style of architecture. Borrowing from the Rajput style, its beauty and elegance are molded according to the local traditions.

With the active patronage of the Maharajas of Patiala, a well-established style of Hindustan I music called the "Patiala Gharana" came into existence and has held its own up to the present times. This school of music has had several famous musicians, many of whom came to Patiala after the disintegration of the Mughal Court at Delhi in the 18th century. At the turn of the century, Ustad Ali Bux was the most renowned exponent of this Gharana. Later, his sons Ustad Akhtar Hussain Khan and Ustad Bade Ghulam Ali Khan achieved worldwide fame and brought glory to the Patiala Gharana.

After the partition of British India, the Muslim community was massacred or forced to flee the city en masse to Pakistan. At the same time, many Hindu and Sikh refugees migrated from Pakistan and settled on the Muslim properties in Patiala. The then Maharaja of Patiala, His Highness Yadavindra Singh, Rajpramukh of PEPSU with his wife Her Highness Maharani Mohinder Kaur organized a large number of camps and worked tirelessly for the people.

District administration

The Deputy Commissioner, an officer belonging to the Indian Administrative Service, is the overall in-charge of the General Administration in the district. He is assisted by a number of officers belonging to Punjab Civil Service and other Punjab state services.

The brand-new Mini Secretariat on Nabha Road, which houses all the major offices including that of the DC and the SSP, was completed in record time, owing to the initiative of the member of parliament of Patiala and local administration.

In India, an Inspector General (IG) of Police is a two-star rank of the Indian Police Service. The ranks above this are Additional Director General (Addl. DG) and Director General (DG) of police. In Patiala, joint commissioners are at the rank of DIG and only additional commissioners are at the rank of IG.

The Senior Superintendent of Police, an officer belonging to the Indian Police Service, is responsible for maintaining law and order and related issues in the district. He is assisted by the officers of the Punjab Police Service and other Punjab Police officials.

The Divisional Forest Officer, an officer belonging to the Indian Forest Service, is responsible for the management of the Forests, Environment and Wild-Life in the district. He is assisted by the officers of the Punjab Forest Service and other Punjab Forest officials and Punjab Wild-Life officials.

Sectoral development is looked after by the district head officer of each development department such as PWD, Health, Education, Agriculture, Animal husbandry, etc. These officers are from Punjab state services.

Transport

It is connected to cities like Ambala, Kaithal, Chandigarh, Amritsar, Delhi etc. by road. Patiala is well connected to cities like Ludhiana, Jalandhar and Amritsar, on NH 1 via State Highway no. 8 till Sirhind, which is on NH 1. Patiala is well connected to Delhi by road as well as by rail. NH 64 (Zirakpur – Patiala – Sangrur – Bhatinda) connects Patiala with Rajpura (on NH 1 and very well connected to Delhi) and Zirakpur (suburb of Chandigarh). Patiala has a railway station under Ambala railway division and Patiala Airport, which is not operational. Patiala is located very close to Nabha city.

Patiala is connected by road to all the major towns.

Distance between the major cities and Patiala:
 Shimla - 
 Ambala - 
 Amritsar - 
 Bathinda - 
 Chandigarh - 
 Chennai - 
 Delhi - 
 Indore - 
 Jaipur - 
 Jalandhar - 
 Jammu - 
 Kolkata - 
 Lahore - 
 Lucknow - 
 Ludhiana - 
 Mumbai - 
 Rajpura - 
 Bassi Pathana - 
 Zirakpur -

Notable people

Suburbs of Patiala
 Nabha (Municipal Council) 
 Rajpura (Municipal Council) 
 Samana (Municipal Council)

See also
 Patiala and East Punjab States Union
 Chandigarh
 Mohali
 Panchkula
 Rajpura
 Fatehgarh Sahib
 Bassi Pathana
 Mandi Gobindgarh

References

External links

 
 Official website of Patiala

 
Former capital cities in India